Lucky and Zorba (literally "The Little Seagull and The Cat") is a 1998 Italian traditional animation film directed by Enzo D'Alò, based on The Story of A Seagull and The Cat Who Taught Her To Fly by Luis Sepúlveda. The movie was dubbed in English and aired on Toon Disney during the early 2000s.

Plot
In the coasts of Hamburg in Germany, a gang of sewer rats steal food as a group of cats led by the Colonel, plan to get rid of the rats and their leader, Big Rat. The plan failed, but the rats were forced to retreat as the other rats pursued the cats, with Zorba (a black cat) injured. During the escape, The cats encounter Bubulina, which Zorba is enamored and leaves. Meanwhile, at the ocean, a petrol ship sinks leaving a lot of petrol in the sea. The next day a seagull flock starts looking for fish in the sea, they dive in and stay there until their leader spots the petrol flood, he warns the rest of the flock, but one of the seagulls named Kengah doesn't hear it and gets dirtied by the petrol. She survives the accident but has trouble with flying. She flies over the city until she falls on a woman's garden, right on top of her cat, Zorba. Being disgusted by the petrol’s taste, Zorba refuses to eat her. Kengah asks him three promises that he must do if she doesn't survive. The first one is that when she lays her egg he must not eat it, the second one is that he must take care of it until it hatches, and third is that he would teach the newborn how to fly.

Zorba promises despite his hesitations, then he goes to find his friends to try to help save Kengah with removing the oil. Zorba gets his friends but when they arrive to save the seagull, it's too late. Under her wing they find her egg, so Zorba tells them about the promises and the cats decide to help him by giving him some instructions (found in encyclopedias in a nearby abandoned museum) on taking care of the egg. Zorba then forces himself to gently sit on the egg and hatch it. Later that night, the cats bury Kengah, as they mourn her death.

Word soon spreads about a cat hatching a bird's egg, until it reaches the ears of Zorba's love interest Bubulina and the town's cats' arch-enemy Great Big Rat, who after hearing the news of the cat-egg makes a plan to make all the town's cats his servants. The egg soon hatches and the cats decide to name the newborn Lucky. Lucky lives with the cats believing to be a cat herself. Her belief soon disappears when Pallino, a red kitten jealous of Lucky because of all the attention and advantages she gets, tells her that she's a bird and that her adoptive father wants to eat her.

Lucky runs away and gets captured by Great Big Rat's minions.  The cats look for her all over the town until they found out that Big Rat has her captured.  The cats Gather as much cheese as possible and use it to create a big wheel of cheese and hide in it (a trick they learned from the Trojan Horse). Pallino, however, goes alone into the sewers and stops the rats before they can eat Lucky, but both of them end up captured. The cat's cheese arrives just in time as the cats jump out and rescue Lucky and Pallino right before Great Big Rat could kill them. The cats throw Great Big Rat and his main henchman into the canals.

Zorba and his friends then decide to teach Lucky how to fly. Lucky fails to successfully fly until Zorba decides to teach her to fly as a seagull mother would. For this Zorba asks Bubulina's owner, a little girl named Nina, to take them to a very high tower where Lucky could jump from the top and, according to her instincts, be able to fly. Despite that cats talking to humans in the same language is forbidden, Zorba tells Nina in her dreams. Lucky tells Zorba that she loves him, calling him by his name for the first time, and he tells her that he loves her, too. The plan succeeds and Lucky starts flying. The Great Big Rat sees the commotion and becomes enraged that his plan failed. Before she leaves, Lucky grabs Pallino and brings him to Zorba. Lucky then says good-bye to Zorba. Pallino then acknowledges Lucky as his little sister, before Lucky gives her first seagull call and joins a flock of seagulls into the night sky.

Voice cast 

 Carlo Verdone as Zorba
 Antonio Albanese as Great Big Rat
 Melba Ruffo di Calabria as Bubulina
 Luis Sepúlveda as the Poet
 Sofia Baratta as Lucky (newborn)
 Veronica Puccio as Lucky (child)
 Domitilla D'Amico as Lucky (teenager)
 Margherita Birri as Nina
 Alida Milana as Kengah
 Paolo Lombardi as Colonel
 Luca Biagini as Diderot
 Valerio Ruggeri as Secretary
 Gabriele Patriarca as Pallino (YoYo in English)
 Paola Tedesco as Rose of the Winds
 Massimo Lodolo as Chamberlain
 Fabrizio Vidale as Igor
 Roberto Stocchi as Rat 1
 Roberto Ciufoli as Rat 2
 Renata Buserni as Doorwoman

Music 
The original score was composed by David Rhodes. The songs So volare and Canto di Kengah are sung by Spagna, Non sono un gatto by Leda Battisti, Siamo gatti by Samuele Bersani, Duro lavoro and Noi siamo topi by Gaetano Curreri and Antonio Albanese.

Box office
The film was one of the highest grossing films of the year in Italy, with a gross of $6.8 million in Italy.

Awards
The film won a special Nastro d'Argento and the audience award at the Montréal International Children's Film Festival. It's the most popular italian animation movie, grossing at 12 billion italian lira (around 7 million USD) at the box office

Home video 
CG Entertainment released the movie in DVD, with both Italian and English language track.

References

External links
 
 
 

Italian animated films
1998 animated films
1998 films
Animated films based on children's books
Films directed by Enzo D'Alò
Films set in Hamburg